RC Murphy's Lommel is a Belgian rugby club in Lommel. The club is so called after its original sponsor, the Murphy's Law pub.

History
The club was founded in 2006.

External links
 RC Murphy's Lommel

Belgian rugby union clubs
Rugby clubs established in 2006
RC Murphy's Lommel